This is a comprehensive list of awards and nominations received by South Korean actress Son Ye-jin. She has been the recipient of numerous awards, including 6 Baeksang Arts Awards, 4 Grand Bell Awards, 6 Blue Dragon Film Awards, and 1 Asia Pacific Film Festival.

Throughout the course of her career, Son has won a total of 50 awards and commendations, including 25 awards for acting. She is also currently the youngest actress to have achieved the "Grand Slam" acting career for winning the three major Korean film awards for Best Actress (Baeksang, Grand Bell, and Blue Dragon).



Awards and nominations

State honors

Rankings

Notes

References

Son Ye-jin